Gyõzõ Burcsa (born 13 March 1954) is a Hungarian former professional footballer who played as a midfielder.

He was a participant in the 1986 FIFA World Cup where Hungary was eliminated in the first round. During that tournament, Gyõzõ played in the Hungary–Canada and the USSR–Hungary matches.

Honours  
Videoton

 UEFA Europa League runner-up: 1984–85

References

External links 
Kutschera A. 2005. 1987 Matches Europe
Histoire de l'A.J. Auxerre
L'equipe

1954 births
Living people
People from Kaposvár
Hungarian footballers
Hungary international footballers
1986 FIFA World Cup players
Association football midfielders
Kaposvári Rákóczi FC players
Fehérvár FC players
Győri ETO FC players
Hungarian expatriate footballers
Expatriate footballers in France
Ligue 1 players
Ligue 2 players
Entente Melun-Fontainebleau 77 players
AJ Auxerre players
Hungarian expatriate sportspeople in France
Arras FA players
Hungarian football managers
Fehérvár FC managers
Sportspeople from Somogy County